FK Skopje is a football club from Skopje, the capital of the North Macedonia. They are currently competing in the Macedonian First League.

History

The club was created in 1960, by uniting FK Metalec and FK Industrijalec. They were originally formed as FK MIK (Metalska Industrija Kale) and later changed their name to FK Skopje during the 1973–74 season. They won the Macedonian Republic League, regional Yugoslav 3rd tier, in 1970. As FK MIK, the club competed for two seasons in the Yugoslav Second League East where they played with teams from federal Republics of Macedonia, Montenegro and Serbia. Since creation of the Macedonian First League, they have played there for 6 seasons: 1997/98, 1998–99, 2010–11, 2017–18, 2021–22 and 2022–23.

Current squad
As of 8 January 2023.

Honours

 Macedonian Second League:
Winners (2): 1996–97, 2020–21

 Macedonian Republic League:
Winners (1): 1969–70

Recent seasons

1The 2019–20 season was abandoned due to the COVID-19 pandemic in North Macedonia.

Supporters
FK Skopje supporters are known as Pirati (Pirates), mostly coming from the Skopje settlement Avtokomanda.

References

External links
Club info at MacedonianFootball 
Football Federation of Macedonia 

Skopje
Association football clubs established in 1960
1960 establishments in the Socialist Republic of Macedonia